The 2020/21 FIS Nordic Combined Continental Cup was the 37th Continental Cup season, organized by the International Ski Federation. It started on 11 December 2020 in Park City, United States, and concluded on 17 March 2021 in Nizhny Tagil, Russia.

Calendar

Men

Women

Standings

Men's Overall

Women's Overall

References 

2020 in Nordic combined
2021 in Nordic combined
FIS Nordic Combined World Cup
Nordic combined